Widows is a 2018 neo-noir heist thriller film directed by Steve McQueen from a screenplay by Gillian Flynn and McQueen, based upon the 1983 British television series of the same name. The plot follows four Chicago women who attempt to steal $5,000,000 from the home of a prominent local politician in order to pay back a crime boss from whom $2,000,000 was stolen by the women's husbands before they were killed in a botched getaway attempt. A British-American co-production, the film stars Viola Davis, Michelle Rodriguez and Elizabeth Debicki in the title roles alongside Cynthia Erivo, Colin Farrell, Brian Tyree Henry, Daniel Kaluuya, Jacki Weaver, Carrie Coon, Robert Duvall, and Liam Neeson in an ensemble supporting cast.

Widows premiered at the Toronto International Film Festival on September 8, 2018, and was theatrically released in the United Kingdom on November 6, 2018 and in the United States on November 16, by 20th Century Fox. The film received critical acclaim, with praise aimed at its direction, editing, screenplay and performances (particularly Davis, Debicki and Kaluuya), with critics crediting it for blending "dramatic themes with popcorn thrills". The film grossed $76 million worldwide on a production budget of $42 million and received several award nominations, among them being one for Davis for the BAFTA Award for Best Actress in a Leading Role.

Plot
In Chicago, Harry Rawlings and his criminal gang's getaway van are blown up during a police standoff after stealing $2,000,000 from crime boss Jamal Manning. Jamal threatens Veronica, Harry's widow, demanding compensation, needing the money to finance his campaign for alderman of a South Side ward. He is running against Jack Mulligan, the next-in-line of a dynastic family that has held the position for decades. Mulligan doesn't like politics, but is happy to profit from it; his father Tom, the previous alderman, warns him that he will face everlasting shame if he loses to Jamal.

Veronica is given a key to a safety deposit box by Bash, Harry's loyal chauffeur, which contains Harry's notebook with a detailed plan for stealing $5 million from Mulligan's home. She is advised to sell the notebook to Jamal's people, but decides against it.

Veronica decides to carry out the heist, recruiting two of the other widows of Harry's gang, Alice and Linda. Alice has lost her livelihood and is pressured by her mother to become a sugar baby. Linda has lost her store, as her husband secretly gambled away the rent payments. The fourth widow, Amanda, does not join them, as Veronica discovers she has a 4-month-old baby. Alice acquires guns and a getaway van while Linda deciphers Harry's blueprints. Jamal's brother and right-hand man Jatemme attacks several witnesses and kills Bash while looking for Harry's notebook. Eventually, Alice uses a real estate executive, her sugar daddy, to identify the blueprint as the safe room in the Mulligan family mansion which also serves as Jack Mulligan's campaign headquarters.

Linda recruits Belle, her babysitter, to be the group's driver. Veronica visits Amanda and notices Harry's flask in the home, which raises the question of what Harry's involvement with Amanda — and the baby — is. Her suspicion is confirmed when her dog paws vigorously at a closet door, indicating she is very familiar with the person behind it - revealed to be Harry after Veronica storms off without a confrontation. It is revealed that Harry double-crossed his crew by deliberately blowing up their getaway van and is in league with Mulligan to ruin Jamal's campaign. Returning home, Veronica opens the door to her son's room and relives the memory of his death: while on the phone with Harry, he was shot by police officers after being pulled over while driving. Veronica visits the Mulligan mansion under the guise of asking Jack for protection from the Mannings, and is able to case the premises while Belle scans the outdoor security.

Veronica blackmails the CEO of the Mulligans' security company for the safe code, using incriminating photos left in Harry's notebook. The heist begins with Belle creating a disturbance down the street to draw the outside security detail away. Veronica and the others stun the security guard inside and intimidate Tom Mulligan's carer. Veronica, Linda, and Alice reach the safe and retrieve the money. Tom Mulligan appears from his bedroom, unmasks Veronica and wounds Alice with a gunshot; Linda fatally shoots him.

The women escape, but Jatemme appears, holds Belle at gunpoint and flees in their van with the money; they follow him in a separate car and ram him from behind, causing him to crash and killing him. They retrieve the money, then get Alice to the hospital. Veronica returns alone to their hideout, where Harry arrives to steal the money, needing $1 million of it to keep Mulligan quiet about his faked death. Harry claims that after the death of their son and subsequent disintegration of their marriage, he wanted to start over with Amanda and their child. Harry retrieves the money in the van and turns to shoot Veronicabut Veronica kills him first, then plants on him the gun used to kill Tom Mulligan.

Mulligan wins the position of alderman due to a sympathy vote following his father's murder. Linda reacquires her store, Alice sets up her own business, and Belle moves away. Veronica donates a large sum to rebuild a school library on the condition that it be named after her son Marcus. Outside of a diner, Veronica sees and warmly greets Alice.

Cast

 Viola Davis as Veronica Rawlings, a Chicago teachers' union delegate and Harry's widow
 Michelle Rodriguez as Linda, a clothing store owner and Carlos's widow
 Elizabeth Debicki as Alice, Florek's widow, who becomes a sugar baby to support herself after her husband's death
 Cynthia Erivo as Belle, a babysitter and beautician who looks after Linda's children and works with Veronica's group
 Colin Farrell as Jack Mulligan, a politician who is mixed up in Veronica's plan
 Brian Tyree Henry as Jamal Manning, a crime boss and politician who believes Veronica is indebted to him
 Daniel Kaluuya as Jatemme Manning, Jamal's brother and mob enforcer
 Jacki Weaver as Agnieska, Alice's abusive mother
 Carrie Coon as Amanda, Jimmy's widow, who is not involved in Veronica's robbery scheme
 Robert Duvall as Tom Mulligan, Jack's father and a power broker at odds with his son
 Liam Neeson as Harry Rawlings, a renowned bank robber who was Veronica's loving husband
 Jon Bernthal as Florek, a member of Harry's gang who was Alice's abusive husband
 Manuel Garcia-Rulfo as Carlos, a member of Harry's gang who was Linda's gambler husband
 Garret Dillahunt as 'Bash' Babiak, Harry and Veronica's chauffeur
 Lukas Haas as David, a real estate developer with whom Alice develops a transactional sexual relationship following Florek's death
 Matt Walsh as Ken, the CEO of a security company
 Kevin J. O'Connor as Bobby Welsh, a disabled bowling alley worker who was formerly involved with Harry
 Jon Michael Hill as Reverend Wheeler
 Coburn Goss as Jimmy Nunn

Production
The project was announced as being in development on March 27, 2015, with a script written by Gillian Flynn and Steve McQueen, and with McQueen attached to direct. In September 2016, Viola Davis joined the cast. It was reported that Jennifer Lawrence was approached for a role, but, due to scheduling conflicts, had to decline. In November 2016, Cynthia Erivo joined the cast. In January 2017, André Holland entered negotiations to co-star in the film, but does not appear in the finished product. The next month, Elizabeth Debicki was cast in the role Lawrence had declined, and Michelle Rodriguez and Daniel Kaluuya were also announced as cast members. In March, Liam Neeson joined the cast. The following month, Colin Farrell was added along with Robert Duvall. In May, Garret Dillahunt, Jacki Weaver, Manuel Garcia-Rulfo, Lukas Haas and Brian Tyree Henry were set to co-star, and in June, Carrie Coon was added. Michael Harney and Jon Bernthal joined the cast in August. The British actress Ann Mitchell, who had portrayed Dolly Rawlins in the television series, has a small part as Amanda's mother.

Principal photography began on May 8, 2017 in Chicago, Illinois.

Hans Zimmer composed the film's score with additional music provided by Steve Mazzaro. The soundtrack, released by Milan Records, includes the score as well as songs by Nina Simone, and the Cool Kids, as well as a new song "The Big Unknown" by Sade later released as a single.

Release
The film had its world premiere at the Toronto International Film Festival on September 8, 2018. It was released in the United States on November 16, 2018.

Reception

Box office
Widows grossed $42.4 million in the United States and Canada, and $33.6 million in other territories, for a total worldwide gross of $76 million, against a production budget of $42 million.

In the United States and Canada, Widows was released alongside Fantastic Beasts: The Crimes of Grindelwald and Instant Family, and was projected to gross $12–18 million from 2,803 theaters in its opening weekend. It grossed $4.2 million on its first day, including $600,000 from Thursday night previews. It ended up making $12.3 million over the weekend, finishing fifth at the box office. Deadline Hollywood stated that the low debut was because of a "lack of urgency" in the advertising, and that the studio should not have relied on the good reviews alone to sell the film. Other publications, including Business Insider, said the film should have been released outside the busy November frame, and that the perceived marketing toward specifically African-American audiences, and its R-rating, limited the film's appeal. In its second weekend, the film dropped 33% to $8.2 million (and $10.5 million total over the five-day Thanksgiving frame), finishing eighth, and then made $4.4 million in its third weekend.

About the box-office and the movie’s reception, Actress Cynthia Erivo said: “There’s something that’s super messy about ‘Widows,’ which I loved. There’s an expectation of a heist movie to be slick and tidy, and it just wasn’t that. I think that was its charm, but I’m not sure that everyone quite understood that. But maybe we’re getting to a place where people will.”

Critical response

The website's critical consensus reads, "Widows rounds up a stellar ensemble for a heist thriller that mixes popcorn entertainment with a message – and marks another artistic leap for director Steve McQueen." On Metacritic, the film has a weighted average score of 84 out of 100, based on 57 critics, indicating "universal acclaim". Audiences polled by CinemaScore gave the film an average grade of "B" on an A+ to F scale, while PostTrak reported filmgoers gave it 3.5 out of 5 stars; social media monitor RelishMix noted online responses to the film were "mixed".

Owen Gleiberman of Variety praised McQueen's direction and Davis's performance and wrote, "The strongest aspect of Widows is the way the movie gets us — and keeps us — rooting for its desperate-living heroines. They're past the point of just wanting to have fun (the subtext of almost every heist movie); they're less concerned with comeuppance than sheer survival." Eric Kohn of IndieWire gave the film an "A−", saying the film "works as well as it does due to the way McQueen juggles substance with entertainment value to such eager subversive ends. The movie engages with topics as complex as sexism, police brutality, and interracial marriage, but it still delivers on the car chases and gunplay. No superhero movie digs this deep." Dirty Movies considered it one of the best films of 2018, describing it as McQueen's best work since Hunger. Representing more critical views, Leah Greenblatt at Entertainment Weekly gave the film a "C+", arguing that it's "not clear exactly what kind of movie(s) Widows wants to be" and that it feels like a "crazy-quilt patchwork of other, better films".

Accolades

Top ten lists
Widows was listed on numerous critics' top ten lists for 2018, among them:

 1st – Richard Roeper, Chicago Sun-Times
 1st – David Sims, The Atlantic
 2nd – Vinnie Mancuso, The Globe and Mail
 3rd – Matthew Jacobs, The Huffington Post
 3rd – Joshua Rothkopf, Time Out New York
 4th – Tim Grierson, Screen Daily
 5th – Brian Tallerico, RogerEbert.com
 5th – Mark Olsen, Los Angeles Times
 6th – Michael Phillips, Chicago Tribune
 6th – Jason Guerrasio, Business Insider
 6th – Kristen Lopez, RogerEbert.com
 7th – Christopher Orr, The Atlantic
 7th – Marlow Stern, The Daily Beast
 8th – Jesse Hassenger, The A.V. Club
 8th – Mara Reinstein, Us Weekly
 8th – Carly Darling, Houston Chronicle
 9th – Max Weiss, Baltimore Magazine
 9th – Omer Mozaffar, RogerEbert.com
 9th – Vinnie Mancuso, Collider.com
 9th – Peter Bradshaw, The Guardian
 10th – The Guardian
 10th – Matt Singer, ScreenCrush
 Top 10 (listed alphabetically) – WIRED
 Top 10 (listed alphabetically) – Hal Boedeker, Orlando Sentinel
 Best of 2018 (listed alphabetically, not ranked), NPR

Awards and nominations

See also
 List of black films of the 2010s

Further reading

References

External links 
 
 
 
 
 

2018 films
2018 crime thriller films
2010s feminist films
2010s heist films
20th Century Fox films
American crime thriller films
American heist films
American neo-noir films
British crime thriller films
British heist films
British neo-noir films
Film4 Productions films
Films about elections
Films about widowhood
Films based on television series
Films directed by Steve McQueen
Films scored by Hans Zimmer
Films set in Chicago
Films shot in Chicago
TSG Entertainment films
Regency Enterprises films
Films produced by Iain Canning
Films produced by Emile Sherman
2010s English-language films
Films produced by Arnon Milchan
2010s American films
2010s British films